Cynisca manei is a worm lizard species in the family Amphisbaenidae. It is endemic to Senegal and Guinea-Bissau.

References

Cynisca (lizard)
Reptiles described in 2014
Taxa named by Jean-François Trape